Cathal McConnor Roe O'Connor (Irish: Cathal mac Conchobair Ruadh Ua Conchobair) was king of Connacht in Ireland. He was son of Connor Roe O'Connor and a member of the Clan Muircheartaigh Uí Conchobhair.

References

 Byrne, Francis John (2001), Irish Kings and High-Kings, Dublin: Four Courts Press, 
 Gaelic and Gaelised Ireland, Kenneth Nicols, 1972.
 The Second Battle of Athenry, Adrian James Martyn, East Galway News & Views, 2008–2009

Kings of Connacht
13th-century Irish monarchs
People from County Roscommon
Cathal